O Homem dos Olhos Tortos (literally "The Man of the Crooked Eyes") is a 1918 Portuguese detective silent film directed by José Leitão de Barros (with art director Luís Reis Santos also sometimes mentioned as co-director), with a cast of amateur actors (that mostly had no roles after this film) with António Sarmento as the hero and Álvaro Pereira as the title-character villain.

Cast
António Sarmento as Gil Goes
Álvaro Pereira as Waldemar Frankel
Raquel Barros as Margarida Costa
Alda de Aguiar as Rosa de Coimbra
Filipe Melo as Lilito de Coimbra

References

External links

Portuguese silent films
Films directed by José Leitão de Barros
Portuguese black-and-white films
Films shot in Lisbon